Blackout is the sixth album by Norwegian rock band Audrey Horne, released in 2018.

Track listing
All tracks written by Audrey Horne.
"This Is War" – 6:15
"Audrevolution" – 3:16
"Blackout" – 4:15
"This One" – 4:34
"Midnight Man" – 3:44
"Light Your Way" – 3:55
"California" – 4:10
"Satellite" – 4:07
"Naysayer" – 3:56
"Rose Alley" – 3:59
Bonus tracks
"Juggernaut" – 4:07
"The End" – 4:56

Personnel

Audrey Horne
Toschie – vocals
Ice Dale (Arve Isdal) – guitars
Thomas Tofthagen – guitars
Kjetil Greve – drums
Espen Lien – bass

Additional personnel
Kato Adland – "Janick Gers" guitar on "This Is War", background vocals, keyboards
Ove Gaassand – Hammond organ on "This Is War", "This One", "Light Your Way" and "California"
Matias Monsen – cello on "This Is War" and "The End"
Silje Wergeland – backing vocals on "This Is War" and "Audrevolution"
Lindy-Fay Hella – backing vocals on "This Is War"
Herbrand Larsen – piano on "Audrevolution" and "The End"

Production
Produced by Kato Adland
Mixed by Kato Adland and Iver Sandøy
"Audrevolution" mixed by Herbrand Larsen
Mastered by Iver Sandøy at Solslottet Studio

Charts

References

2018 albums
Audrey Horne (band) albums
Napalm Records albums